Madame Tussauds Las Vegas is a wax museum located in the Las Vegas Strip at The Venetian Las Vegas casino resort in Paradise, Nevada. The attraction opened in 1999, becoming the first Madame Tussauds venue to open in the United States. It features over 100 wax figures of famous celebrities, film and TV characters, athletes, musicians and Marvel superheroes, as well a 4D movie theatre. Subsequent Madame Tussauds venues opened in the U.S in New York City in 2000, Washington D.C. in 2007, and Hollywood, California in 2009.

Wax making process 
The process of making a wax figure can take anywhere from four to six months. After a survey has been conducted on who the attraction should include, researchers find out as much information as possible about the chosen celebrities including their hairstyle, common facial expressions, and clothing preferences.
If they are able, celebrities visit the Madame Tussauds stylists who take more than 150 measurements and 200 photos, and use an oil-based paint to create a realistic skin complexion. The figure is not made entirely of wax, but also uses clay and steel. 
Some celebrities have been directly involved in their figure’s creation. Gwen Stefani teamed up with the Madame Tussauds Las Vegas in-house team to achieve the style of her wax figure, while Fergie from the Black Eyed Peas donated one of her dresses to the museum.

Notable figures

References

Museums in the Las Vegas Valley
Wax museums in the United States
Biographical museums in Nevada
Madame Tussauds